The following is a list of maritime patrol aircraft, which are sometimes referred to as Maritime reconnaissance, coastal reconnaissance or patrol bombers depending on the service and the time period, and are characterized by their use in controlling sea lanes.

Maritime patrol aircraft

|-
| AD Flying Boat || UK ||  || 1916 ||  ||  ||
|-
| Aichi H9A || Japan ||  || 1940 || retired ||  ||
|-
| Airbus A319 MPA || France ||  || 1995 || In service ||  || 
|-
| Armstrong Whitworth Whitley || UK ||  || 1936 || retired ||  ||
|-
| ATR 42 MP Surveyor || Italy ||  || 1984 || In service ||  ||
|-
| ATR 72 MP || Italy ||  || 1988 || In service ||  ||
|-
| ATR 72 ASW || France ||  || 1988 || In service ||  ||
|-
| Avro Anson || UK ||  || 1935 || retired ||  || 
|-
| Avro Lancaster GR.III/MR.III/10MR/MP || UK & Canada ||  || 1941 || retired ||  (GR.III/MR.III)  - (10MR/MP)|| 
|-
| Avro Shackleton || UK ||  || 1949 || retired ||  ||
|-
| B class blimp || USA ||  || 1917 || retired ||  ||
|-
| BAE Systems Nimrod MRA4 || UK ||  || 2004 || cancelled 2010 ||  ||
|-
| Beechcraft King Air || USA ||  || 1963 || In service ||  ||
|-
| Basler BT-67 || USA ||  || 1990 || In service ||  ||
|-
| Beriev Be-6 || USSR ||  || 1943 || retired ||  ||
|-
| Beriev Be-10 || USSR ||  || 1956 || retired ||  ||
|-
| Beriev Be-12 || USSR ||  || 1960 || In service ||  ||
|-
| Beriev Be-42 || Russia ||  || 1986 || In service ||  ||
|-
| Beriev MBR-2 || USSR ||  || 1931 || retired ||  ||
|-
| Blackburn Iris || UK ||  || 1926 || retired ||  ||
|-
| Blackburn Perth || UK ||  || 1933 || retired ||  ||
|-
| Blohm & Voss BV 138 || Germany ||  || 1937 || retired ||  ||
|-
| Boeing XPBB Sea Ranger || United States ||  || 1942 || retired ||  ||
|-
| Boeing 737 Surveiller || USA ||  || 1967 || In service ||  || 
|-
| Boeing P-8 Poseidon || USA ||  || 2009 || In service ||  ||
|-
| Bombardier DHC-8 MPA/MSA variants || Canada ||  || 2007 || In service ||  || 
|-
| Breguet 521 || France ||  || 1933 ||  ||  || 
|-
| Breguet Alizé || France ||  || 1956 ||  ||  ||
|-
| Breguet Atlantic || France ||  || 1965 ||  ||  ||
|-
| Britten-Norman Defender/Islander || UK ||  || 1970 ||  ||  || 
|-
| C class blimp || USA ||  || 1918 || retired ||  ||
|-
| C-Star class blimp || UK ||  || 1918 ||  ||  ||
|-
| CAMS 55 || France ||  || 1928 ||  ||  ||
|-
| Canadair CP-107 Argus || Canada ||  || 1957 || retired ||  ||
|-
| Canadian Vickers Vancouver || Canada ||  || 1929 || retired ||  ||
|-
| CANT Z.501 || Italy ||  || 1934 ||  ||  ||
|-
| CANT Z.506 || Italy ||  || 1935 ||  || + ||
|-
| Caproni Ca.314-SC || Italy ||  || 1940 ||  ||  ||
|-
| CASA C-212 MPA || Spain ||  || 1971 ||  ||  || 
|-
| CASA/IPTN CN-235 MPA/HC-144 Ocean Sentry || Spain & Indonesia ||  || 1983 ||  || + || 
|-
| Chyetverikov MDR-6 || USSR ||  || 1937 ||  ||  ||
|-
| Coastal class blimp || UK ||  || 1916 ||  ||  ||
|-
| Consolidated P2Y || USA ||  || 1929 ||  ||  ||
|-
| Consolidated PBY Catalina || USA ||  || 1935 ||  ||  || 
|-
| Consolidated PB2Y Coronado || USA ||  || 1937 ||  ||  ||
|-
| Consolidated PB4Y-1 Liberator || USA ||  || 1939 ||  ||  ||
|-
| Consolidated PB4Y-2 Privateer || USA ||  || 1943 ||  ||  ||
|-
| Convair P5Y || USA ||  || 1950 ||  ||  ||
|-
| Curtiss Model H || USA ||  || 1914 ||  ||  ||
|-
| Curtiss HS-1L & HS-2L || USA ||  || 1917 ||  || ~ ||
|-
| D class blimp || USA ||  || 1920 ||  ||  ||
|-
| Dassault Falcon 20G || France ||  || 1963 ||  ||  ||
|-
| Dassault Falcon 50M || France ||  || 1976 ||  ||  ||
|-
| Dassault Falcon 900 MSA || France ||  || 1984 ||  ||  ||
|-
| Diamond DA42 Guardian || Austria ||  || 2002 ||  ||  ||
|-
| Donnet-Denhaut flying boat || France ||  || 1915 ||  || ~ ||
|-
| Dornier Wal || Germany ||  || 1922 ||  || + ||
|-
| Dornier Do 24 || Germany ||  || 1937 ||  ||  ||
|-
| Dornier 228 || Germany ||  || 1981 ||  ||  ||
|-
| Douglas B-18 Bolo/Digby || USA ||  || 1935 ||  ||  ||
|-
| Douglas/BSAS Turbo Dakota || USA ||  || 1991 ||  ||  ||
|-
| Douglas PD-1 || USA ||  || 1923 ||  ||  ||
|-
| CASA C-295 MPA || Spain ||  || 1997 ||  ||  ||
|-
| Embraer EMB 111 Bandeirante || Brazil ||  || 1968 ||  || + ||
|-
| Embraer R-99 || Brazil ||  || 2001 ||  || + ||
|-
| Embraer P-99 (EMB-145MP) || Brazil ||  || 2003 ||  ||  || 
|-
| Fairey Gannet || UK ||  || 1949 ||  ||  ||
|-
| FBA Types A, B, C & S || France ||  || 1913 ||  || ~ ||
|-
| FBA Type H || France ||  || 1915 ||  || ~ ||
|-
| FBA Type S || France ||  || 1917 ||  ||  ||
|-
| Felixstowe F.2 || UK ||  || 1916 ||  ||  ||
|-
| Felixstowe F.3 || UK ||  || 1917 ||  ||  ||
|-
| Felixstowe F5L/Curtiss F5L || UK & US ||  || 1918 ||  ||  || 
|-
| Fiat RS.14 || Italy ||  || 1939 ||  ||  ||
|-
| Focke-Wulf Fw 200 || Germany ||  || 1937 ||  ||  ||
|-
| Fokker F27 200-MAR || Netherlands ||  || 1955 ||  ||  || 
|-
| Fokker F27 Maritime Enforcer || Netherlands ||  || 1955 ||  ||  ||
|-
| Fokker T.IV || Netherlands ||  || 1927 ||  ||  ||
|-
| Fokker T.VIII || Netherlands ||  || 1938 ||  ||  ||
|-
| Friedrichshafen FF.60 || Germany ||  || 1918 ||  ||  ||
|-
| Gotha WD.9 || Germany ||  || 1914 ||  ||  ||
|-
| Gotha WD.27 || Germany ||  || 1918 ||  ||  ||
|-
| Grumman AF Guardian || USA ||  || 1945 ||  ||  ||
|-
| Grumman Tracker || USA ||  || 1952 ||  ||  ||
|-
| Hall PH || USA ||  || 1929 ||  ||  ||
|-
| Harbin SH-5 || China ||  || 1976 ||  ||  ||
|-
| Hawker-Siddeley Nimrod || UK ||  || 1967 ||  ||  ||
|-
| Hiro H4H || Japan ||  || 1931 ||  ||  ||
|-
| IAI 1124N Sea Scan || Israel ||  || 1977 ||  ||  ||
|-
| IAI Heron || Israel ||  || 2005 ||  ||  ||UAV
|-
| Ilyushin Il-38 || USSR ||  || 1967 ||  ||  ||
|-
| Junkers Ju 290 || Germany ||  || 1942 ||  ||  ||
|-
| K-class blimp || USA ||  || 1938 ||  ||  ||
|-
| Kawanishi H3K || Japan ||  || 1930 ||  ||  ||
|-
| Kawanishi H6K Mavis || Japan ||  || 1936 ||  ||  ||
|-
| Kawanishi H8K Emily || Japan ||  || 1941 ||  ||  ||
|-
| Kawasaki P-1 || Japan ||  || 2007 ||  ||  ||
|-
| Kawasaki P-2J || Japan ||  || 1966 ||  ||  || 
|-
| Keystone PK-1 || USA ||  || 1930 ||  ||  ||
|-
| Kyushu Q1W || Japan ||  || 1943 ||  ||  ||
|-
| Lockheed Hudson || USA ||  || 1938 ||  ||  ||
|-
| Lockheed PV-1 Ventura || USA ||  || 1940 ||  ||  ||
|-
| Lockheed PV-2 Harpoon || USA ||  || 1943 ||  ||  ||
|-
| Lockheed P-2 Neptune || USA ||  || 1945 ||  ||  ||
|-
| Lockheed P-3 Orion || USA ||  || 1959 ||  ||  || 
|-
| Lockheed P-7 || USA ||  || 2000 ||  ||  ||
|-
| Lockheed S-3 Viking || USA ||  || 1972 ||  ||  ||
|-
| Lohner L || Austria-Hungary ||  || 1915 ||  || + ||
|-
| Loire 70 || France ||  || 1933 ||  ||  ||
|-
| M class blimp || USA ||  || 1944 ||  ||  ||
|-
| Macchi M.C.99 || Italy ||  || 1937 ||  ||  ||
|-
| Mann Egerton Type B || UK ||  || 1916 ||  ||  ||
|-
| Marinens Flyvebaatfabrikk M.F.11 || Norway ||  || 1931 ||  ||  ||
|-
| Martin PM-1 || USA ||  || 1930 ||  ||  ||
|-
| Martin PM-2 || USA ||  || 1931 ||  ||  ||
|-
| Martin P2M || USA ||  || 1929 ||  ||  ||
|-
| Martin P3M || USA ||  || 1931 ||  ||  ||
|-
| Martin P4M Mercator || USA ||  || 1946 ||  ||  || 
|-
| Martin P5M Marlin || USA ||  || 1948 ||  ||  ||
|-
| Martin P6M SeaMaster || United States ||  || 1955 ||  ||  ||
|-
| Martin PBM Mariner || USA ||  || 1939 ||  ||  ||
|-
| Myasishchev 3M/3MD || USSR ||  || 1956 ||  ||  || 
|-
| Naval Aircraft Factory PN || USA ||  || 1922 ||  ||  ||
|-
| Nord 1402 Noroit || France ||  || 1949 ||  ||  ||
|-
| Norman Thompson N.T.4 || UK ||  || 1916 ||  ||  ||
|-
| North Sea class blimp || UK ||  || 1917 ||  ||  ||
|-
| Northrop Grumman MQ-4C Triton || USA ||  || 2013 ||  ||  || Drones
|-
| PZL M28B Bryza || Poland ||  || 1984 ||  ||  ||
|-
| Rogožarski SIM-XIV-H || Yugoslavia ||  || 1938 ||  ||  ||
|-
| Rohrbach Ro IV || Denmark & UK ||  || 1925 ||  ||  ||
|-
| Royal Aircraft Factory C.E.1 || UK ||  || 1918 ||  ||  ||
|-
| Saab Swordfish || Sweden ||  || 2016 ||  || || 
|-
| Saro Lerwick || UK ||  || 1938 ||  ||  ||
|-
| Saro London || UK ||  || 1934 ||  ||  ||
|-
| Savoia-Marchetti S.55 || Italy ||  || 1924 ||  || + ||
|-
| Savoia-Marchetti S.59 || Italy ||  || 1925 ||  || + ||
|-
| Savoia-Marchetti SM.62 || Italy ||  || 1926 ||  ||  ||
|-
| Shaanxi Y-8F, Q & X || China ||  || 1984 ||  ||  ||
|-
| Shin Meiwa PS-1 || Japan ||  || 1967 ||  ||  ||
|-
| Short Type 184 || UK ||  || 1915 ||  ||  ||
|-
| Short Empire || UK ||  || 1936 ||  ||  || 
|-
| Short Rangoon || UK ||  || 1930 ||  ||  ||
|-
| Short S.26/M || UK ||  || 1939 ||  ||  ||
|-
| Short Seaford || UK ||  || 1944 ||  ||  ||
|-
| Short Seavan || UK ||  || 1976 ||  ||  ||
|-
| Short Shetland || UK ||  || 1944 ||  ||  ||
|-
| Short Singapore III || UK ||  || 1934 ||  ||  ||
|-
| Short Sunderland || UK ||  || 1937 ||  ||  ||
|-
| Submarine Scout class blimp || UK ||  || 1915 ||  ||  ||
|-
| Submarine Scout Pusher class blimp || UK ||  || 1917 ||  ||  ||
|-
| Submarine Scout Twin class blimp || UK ||  || 1918 ||  ||  ||
|-
| Submarine Scout Zero class blimp || UK ||  || 1916 ||  ||  ||
|-
| Supermarine Scapa || UK ||  || 1932 ||  ||  ||
|-
| Supermarine Southampton || UK ||  || 1925 ||  ||  ||
|-
| Supermarine Stranraer || UK ||  || 1934 ||  ||  || 
|-
| Tupolev Tu-16T/PL/R/RM/SP || USSR ||  || 1952 ||  ||  || 
|-
| Tupolev Tu-95MR || USSR ||  || 1961 ||  ||  ||
|-
| Tupolev Tu-142 || USSR ||  || 1968 ||  ||  ||
|-
| Vickers Warwick GR Mk.II and V || UK ||  || 1939 ||  ||  ||
|-
| Vickers Wellington GR.Mk.VIII/XI/XII/XIII/XIV || UK ||  || 1936 ||  ||  ||
|-
| Yokosuka H5Y || Japan ||  || 1936 ||  ||  ||
|-
| Zeppelin-Lindau (Dornier) Rs.I || Germany ||  || 1915 ||  ||  ||
|-
| Zeppelin-Lindau (Dornier) Rs.II || Germany ||  || 1916 ||  ||  ||
|-
| Zeppelin-Lindau (Dornier) Rs.III || Germany ||  || 1917 ||  ||  ||
|-
| Zeppelin-Lindau (Dornier) Rs.IV || Germany ||  || 1918 ||  ||  || 
|}

References

Notes

Citations

Bibliography
 

Bomber aircraft
Patrol aircraft
Lists of aircraft by role
Lists of military aircraft